Lufkin is the largest city in Angelina County, Texas and the county seat. Its estimated population is 35,021 as of July 1, 2019.

Lufkin was founded in 1884 and named for Abraham P. Lufkin. It originally served as a stop on the Houston, East and West Texas Railway. It was officially incorporated on October 15, 1890. Lufkin continued to serve as a stop on the railroad until 1890. Three businessmen founded Angelina Lumber Company, which led to much of the economic prosperity Lufkin later had. When the so-called "timber boom" came to an end, a new "golden era of expansion" began. Lufkin became more industrialized with the opening of Lufkin Industries and Southland Paper Mill. In the mid-1960s, a cultural expansion began, and improvements were made to education and the way of life, including museums and the opening of a new library.

The City of Lufkin has a council–manager government, with 6 city council members, a mayor, and a city manager. The Lufkin Independent School District encompasses most of Lufkin and operates almost all of the schools within Lufkin. Additionally, Angelina College, a community college, is located in Lufkin.

History

The city was originally founded in 1882 as a stop on the Houston, East and West Texas Railway; it is named for Abraham P. Lufkin, a cotton merchant and Galveston city councilman. Lufkin was the father-in-law of Paul Bremond, president of the railroad, which developed the town. Lufkin continued to grow because of its proximity to the railroad and its lumber industry. The history of Lufkin can be divided into three main eras, the railroad era, the timber boom, and the golden era of expansion.

Railroad era

The railroad era lasted between 1882 and 1890. In 1881, the area that is now Lufkin was little more than a small settlement known as Denman Springs. A railroad surveying team began to plan a route through Angelina County, with a possible route through Homer, Texas, which at the time was the county seat. According to legend, the men in the surveying team began to get rowdy in the saloon in Homer, which led to their arrest. They paid their way out the next morning, but this infuriated the chief surveyor. He ordered the team for the rail line to bypass Homer and go by Denman Springs. Conveniently, the new route went through the property of Lafayette Denman and his son, Dr. A. M. Denman, who as the legend goes, had hosted the surveying team a few days earlier. This legend is most likely not true since the prospectus in 1879 already had the railroad planned to bypass Homer and go through the future site of Lufkin.

The railroad officially arrived in 1882, and the company began to advertise the sale of lots of land in Lufkin. During this time, many of the businesses and professionals from Homer began to relocate to Lufkin to be closer to the railroad. Some of the first stores in Lufkin included S. Abram's general store, Joseph Kerr's grocery and saddle shop, and W. H. Bonner's general store, all located on Cotton Square, which became the center of most economic activity in Lufkin. Behind the depot, which was on the cotton square, cotton was stored before being shipped on the railroad. The town continued to grow, and acquired a post office in 1882 with  William A. Abney as postmaster. Soon after in 1883, a telegraph line was strung connecting Lufkin to Nacogdoches by telegraph. On October 15, 1890, the town was officially incorporated. The first mayor of Lufkin was J. M. Smith, who was the owner of Smith Hotel; he was elected on November 15, 1890. Even before the incorporation of Lufkin, the courthouse was sought to have been moved. By a vote in 1885, though, the courthouse remained in Homer. In November 1891, a fire of mysterious origin destroyed the courthouse in Homer. This prompted a petition from the citizens of Lufkin asking for a new election to be held to decide if the courthouse should be relocated to Lufkin. The election was held on January 2, 1892, and the citizens decided to relocate the courthouse to Lufkin.

Timber boom

The timber boom lasted between 1890 and 1920. Three main lumbering families  are recognized for much of the economic prosperity in Lufkin - the Kurths, the Hendersons, and the Wieners. Joseph H. Kurth Sr., was a German immigrant, who had operated a sawmill in Polk County, Texas. He moved to a small settlement north of Lufkin known as Keltys. In 1887, Kurth obtained a sawmill from Charles L. Kelty. He was soon joined by S. W. Henderson Sr., and Sam Wiener, both of Corrigan, Texas. In 1890, the men started the Angelina County Lumber Company. The company became the forerunner of the lumber industry in East Texas, and led to much of the economic prosperity in Lufkin. At the peak of the three families' activities, nearly a dozen sawmills and several other industries were operating.

Golden era of expansion

The golden era of expansion occurred between 1938 and 1945. In the late 1930s, two of the principal industries in Lufkin, the Southland Paper Mill, later known as Abitibi Bowater Inc. which closed in 2007, and  Texas Foundries opened. These companies provided much of Lufkin's industrial growth. The largest industrial employer was Lufkin Foundry and Machine Company, later known as Lufkin Industries; it ceased operations in 2018.

Cultural expansion

In early Lufkin history, most daily life revolved around churches, schools, and sports activities, but this began to change between 1965 and 1983, when Lufkin began a cultural expansion. Improvements included the Kurth Memorial Library, new museums, a civic center, Angelina College, a new federal building, a country club, municipal and city parks, two shopping malls, and the Lufkin Independent School District. Lufkin celebrated its centennial in 1982.

Recent history

Debris from the Space Shuttle Columbia disaster fell over the Lufkin area on February 1, 2003.

A Little League Baseball team from Lufkin, locally known as the Thundering 13, won the U.S. Championship at the 2017 Little League World Series in Williamsport, Pennsylvania. There have been many community tributes to the team.

Geography

Lufkin is at the crossroads of East Texas at the intersections of Highways US 59, future Interstate 69, which leads to Houston and the Rio Grande Valley to the south and Nacogdoches and Texarkana to the north, and US 69, which leads from the Golden Triangle of southeast Texas (Port Arthur and Beaumont) to points such as Jacksonville, Tyler, Dallas, and Oklahoma to the north.

The elevation of Lufkin is 139 to 404 ft above mean sea level.

National forests and grasslands

The headquarters of all four United States National Forests and two United States National Grasslands in Texas are located in Lufkin. They are the Angelina, Davy Crockett, Sabine, and Sam Houston National Forests, and the Caddo and Lyndon B. Johnson National Grasslands.

Climate
Lufkin is a humid subtropical climate that generally has relatively high temperatures with evenly distributed precipitation throughout the year. Generally, this climate is seen on the eastern side continents between 20 and 35°N or S latitude. During summer, these regions over low-latitude ocean waters are generally under the influence of hot, maritime overflow from the western side of subtropical anticyclonic cells. These higher temperatures can lead to warm, oppressive nights. Due to an increase in thunderstorms, summers in Lufkin are usually wetter than winters. Additionally, tropical cyclones can increase precipitation during the summer. Cold months are usually mild and frost is uncommon.

Demographics

2020 United States Census
Note: the US Census treats Hispanic/Latino as an ethnic category. This table excludes Latinos from the racial categories and assigns them to a separate category. Hispanics/Latinos can be of any race. 

As of the 2020 United States census, there were 34,143 people, 12,755 households, and 8,277 families residing in the city.

2019 Estimates
The population of the city is estimated to be 35,021 in 2019. The racial makeup of the city is estimated to be 66.6% White, 25.2% African American, 0.7% American Indian or Alaska native, 2.2% Asian, and 2.2% of two or more races. Hispanic or Latinos of any race were estimated to be 28.6%. White alone (not Hispanic or Latino) is estimated to be 41.8%; 11.3% of the population is estimated to be foreign born. An estimated 24.4% of homes are thought to speak a language other than English.

With an estimated 12,910 households, the city averaged 2.68 persons per household. The median household income is estimated to be $43,803, and the per capita income is $23,134; 20.9% of persons are believed to be below the poverty line.

2010 United States Census
As of the census of 2010, 35,067 people, 12,928 households, and 8,717 families resided in the city. The population density was 1,050.7 people per square mile. The racial makeup of the city was 56.7% White, 27.4% African American, 0.5% Native American, 1.7% Asian,  11.6% from other races, and 2.2 two or more races. Hispanics or Latinos of any race were 24.1% of the population.

Of the 12,929 households, 31.6% had children under the age of 18 living with them, 44.2% were married couples living together, 18.6% had a female householder with no husband present, and 32.6% were not families; 27.8% of all households were made up of individuals, and 26.7% had someone living alone who was 65 years of age or older. The average household size was 2.62 and the average family size was 3.21.

In the city, the age distribution was 8.3% under 5 years, 7.5% from 5 to 9, 7.1% from 10 to 14, 7.2% from 15 to 19, 7.4% from 20 to 24, 7.1% from 25 to 29, 6.6% from 30 to 34, 5.8% from 35 to 39, 5.9% from 40 to 44, 6.2% from 45 to 49, 6.3% from 50 to 54, 5.5% from 55 to 59, 4.8% from 60 to 64, 3.7% from 65 to 69, 3.2% from 70 to 74, 2.7% from 75 to 79, 2.4% from 80 to 84, and 2.4% 85 and over. The median age was 34 years.

Economy

Lufkin is home to Lufkin Industries and Lufkin Gears LLC, which manufactures and services oil field equipment and power transmission equipment, and supplies of creosote-treated utility poles. It is also home to the Atkinson Candy Company, the creator of the Chick-O-Stick, and Brookshire Brothers, a chain of grocery stores in Texas and Louisiana. Lufkin received Texas's first biomass power plant in late 2009. Aspen Power is building the power plant.

Some of the city's major employers include:
 Angelina College, community college with enrollment of 5,000
 Atkinson Candy Company, founded and headquartered in Lufkin
 Brookshire Brothers, a regional grocery company founded and headquartered in Lufkin
 Lufkin Industries, founded and headquartered in Lufkin, oil pumping manufacturer
 Lufkin Gears LLC, founded and headquartered in Lufkin, power transmission equipment manufacturer 
 Lufkin Independent School District
 Pilgrim's, poultry processor that employs more than 1,500 people
 Stephen F. Austin State University, state university (located in Nacogdoches; some employees reside in Lufkin) 
 Temple-Inland is Fortune 500 company that produces paper, wood, and other related products. Temple-Inland was sold to International Paper.

According to the city's 2019 Comprehensive Annual Financial Report, the top employers in the city are:

Festivals

September ~ Texas State Forest Festival and Southern Hushpuppy Championships. Brings net profits to the city of US$60,000.

Points of interest

 Ellen Trout Zoo, public zoo owned by the City of Lufkin with more than 500 animals
 Ellen Trout Park, a public park with a lake and playgrounds
 Crown Colony Country Club Golf Course, third-rated golf course in Texas by the Dallas Morning News
 Texas Forestry Museum features exhibits about forestry of the Lufkin and East Texas area.
 Museum of East Texas, exhibits on regional history and art
 Lufkin Azalea Trail,  public nature trail
 Medford Collection of American Western Art, the contemporary art collection at the Lufkin City Hall
 Downtown Walking Tour, a tour through historic downtown Lufkin
 First United Methodist Church
 Pines Theater, refurbished multiuse facility in downtown, seats 459
 Naranjo Museum of Natural History

Government

Lufkin in comparison to the U.S. average leans more conservative politically. However, the city leans more liberal than Angelina County and the state Texas' averages. In the 2016 United States presidential election, Republican candidate Donald Trump dominated in the southern and western parts of Lufkin while Democratic candidate Hillary Clinton won by large margins in the central, northern, and northeast parts of Lufkin.

Federal government
Lufkin falls under Texas's 1st congressional district, which is currently represented by Republican Louie Gohmert. The  senators who represent Texas are Ted Cruz and John Cornyn, who are both Republicans.

State government
In the Texas House of Representatives, Lufkin falls under district 57 and is represented by Republican Trent Ashby, who is a resident of Lufkin. In the Texas Senate Lufkin falls under district 3 and is represented by Republican Robert Nichols.

Municipal government
According to the city's 2017 Comprehensive Annual Financial Report, Lufkin's various funds had $38.8 million in revenue, $43.7 million in expenditures, $85.7 million in total assets, $5.3 million in total liabilities, and $14.9 million in cash and investments.

The City of Lufkin has a council-manager form of government. The city is divided into six city council districts, and the mayor is elected by a citywide vote. All elected positions are elected on a nonpartisan ballot, as required by Texas law. The city council's responsibility is to make all legislative and policy decisions, while the responsibility of the city manager is to decide all administrative decisions.

Interm City Manager, Kevin Gee
City Secretary, Kara Andrepon

Crime
In 2018, Lufkin's crime rate was 4,666 crimes per 100,000 persons, which was an overall decrease by 2% from 2017; 134 violent crimes and 1,403 property crimes were reported.

Education

According to the United States Census Bureau 80.7% of people in Lufkin above the age of 25 are high-school graduates or higher. About 21.5% of people 25 and older have a bachelor's degree or higher.

Almost all of Lufkin's public schools are operated by the Lufkin Independent School District, with a few small sections in the west within the Hudson Independent School District.  A very small portion of the city on Highway 69 is within Central ISD. Lufkin also has a small charter school, Pineywoods Community Academy, that serves grades Pre-K–12 and is an early college high school. Additionally, Lufkin is served by two small private schools, St. Cyprian's Episcopal School and St. Patrick Catholic School.

Angelina College, a community college, is located in Lufkin. The college has roughly 5,000 students. Additionally, Stephen F. Austin State University is located not far away in Nacogdoches, Texas.

Infrastructure

Transportation
Lufkin is served by U.S. Highway 69, U.S. Highway 59, State Highway 94, and State Highway 103.

Lufkin will be served by the extension to Interstate 69, which is planned to run from the Canada–US border at Port Huron, Michigan, to the Texas/Mexico border.

General aviation service is provided by Angelina County Airport.

The Coach USA bus lines serve Lufkin, carried under the Kerrville Bus Company.

Brazos Transit District (formerly Brazos Valley Transit Authority) provides regularly scheduled public bus service in the Lufkin area.

The Angelina and Neches River Railroad (A&NR) runs through Lufkin.

Health care
Lufkin is served by two hospitals: CHI St. Luke's Health Memorial (formerly Memorial Health System of East Texas at Lufkin), which includes the Arthur Temple Sr. Regional Cancer Center, and Woodland Heights Medical Center.

Media

Newspaper
 The Lufkin Daily News

Television
 KTRE: KTRE Channel 9 (ABC)
 KYTX: KYTX Channel 19 (CBS)
  KFXK-LP: KFXL Channel 30 (FOX)
 KLNM-LD: Millennium Communications (AmericaOne) Digital 42.1 and 42.2(AMGTV)

Radio

AM stations
 KRBA: 1340 AM The Pioneer radio station in East Texas.  Established in 1938.  (News/Talk, Variety)
 KSML (AM): ESPN 1260 (Sports)
 KSFA: News Talk 860 (News/Talk)
 XEG: 1050 AM La Ranchera de Monterrey (Regional Mexican) (Night Time)

FM stations
 KSAU: 90.1 Your East Texas Alternative (College)
 KYKS: Kicks 105 (Country)
 KJCS: 103 The Bull (Classic Country)
 KYBI: Y100 (Country)
 KSML-FM: Super Mix 101.9 (Regional Mexican)
 KAFX-FM: KFOX 95.5 (Top 40)
 KLDN: Red River Radio (NPR)
 KTBQ: Classic Rock Q107 (Classic Rock)
 KVLL: La Mejor 94.7 (Regional Mexican)
 KSWP: 90.9 KSWP (Contemporary Christian)
 KAVX: KAVX 91.9 (Christian talk)
 KXXE: The New Country Channel (Hot Country)
 KOYE: La Invasora 97.5 (Regional Mexican)
 KTHT: Country Legends 97.1 (Classic Country)
 KGFZ: Z-97.7 (Hip Hop/R&B)
 KHPT: The Eagle 106.9 (107.5 simulcast KGLK) (Classic Rock)

Notable people

 Jacques Abram, classical pianist
 Trent Ashby, member of the Texas House of Representatives from Lufkin
 Louis Beam, American white supremacist and neo-fascist
 Brandon Belt, Toronto Blue Jays first baseman and 2012 and 2014 World Series champion with the San Francisco Giants
 Dez Bryant, former Oklahoma State University standout; former Dallas Cowboys wide receiver. Current NFL Free Agent
 Carrington Byndom, former Carolina Panthers cornerback, current NFL Free Agent
 Corey Clark, American Idol contestant, famous for his alleged affair with Paula Abdul, and disqualification from the show for legal troubles 
 Keke Coutee,  Houston Texans wide receiver 
 Anthony Denman, former NFL linebacker 
 Medford Bryan Evans, college professor, author, conservative political activist, born in Lufkin in 1907
 Jermichael Finley, former Texas Longhorns football standout and Green Bay Packers tight end
 William Delbert Gann, finance trader
 Rex Hadnot, former Houston Cougars guard and San Diego Chargers guard
 Dante Hall, former Texas A&M running back, former Kansas City Chiefs and St. Louis Rams wide receiver and return specialist
 Max Hopper, pre-eminent modern-era CIO and a founding father of IT-inspired competitive advantage
 Ken Houston, Lufkin Dunbar graduate who played for the Houston Oilers and Washington Redskins, Pro Football Hall of Famer
 Ray Jones, former NFL defensive back
 Reagan Jones, founder and vocalist of electronica band Iris
 Terrence Kiel, former Texas A&M University and San Diego Chargers safety
 Jorvorskie Lane, former Tampa Bay Buccaneers fullback, former Texas A&M University football player, held school record for career rushing touchdowns (49) for three years
 Abe Martin, college football coach
 Reggie McNeal, former Texas A&M University quarterback and Cincinnati Bengals wide receiver
 Don Muhlbach, former Texas A&M University football player; current Detroit Lions long snapper
 Tom Murphy, former Major League Baseball pitcher
 Jim Reese, former guitarist for the Bobby Fuller Four, lived there until his death in 1991 and is buried in the Garden of Memories cemetery.
 Joe Robb, former NFL lineman
 Ryan Rottman, actor
 Pete Runnels, former Washington Senators, Boston Red Sox, and Houston Colt .45s infielder
 Kimberly Saenz, convicted serial killer
 Chris Seelbach, former Atlanta Braves pitcher
 Jacoby Shepherd, former NFL cornerback
 Allan Shivers, 37th Texas governor, 1949–1957
 Tedashii, Christian rapper
 Buddy Temple, businessman and former politician
 T.J. Turner, former NFL defensive end
 Charlie Wilson, former U.S Representative best known for his involvement in Operation Cyclone, as depicted in the book and movie Charlie Wilson's War
 J. Frank Wilson, lead vocalist of J. Frank Wilson and the Cavaliers

References

External links

 
Cities in Angelina County, Texas
Cities in Texas
County seats in Texas
Micropolitan areas of Texas